Spring is the first extended play and second musical release by South Korean brother-sister duo, AKMU.

Background
On April 25, 2016, YG Entertainment revealed the first teaser picture, with the title of the album. On April 27, they released an artist film for the album. Two days later, the album's track list was revealed.

Promotion and release
The album was released digitally on May 5 and physically on May 11, 2016. AKMU held a mini-concert on May 5. The concert was broadcast on Naver's V app.

Track listing

Release history

Notes

References

External links
 
 

AKMU albums
2016 EPs
YG Entertainment albums
Genie Music albums
YG Entertainment EPs